The 2003 Derbyshire Dales District Council election took place on 1 May 2003 to elect members of Derbyshire Dales District Council in Derbyshire, England. The whole council was up for election with boundary changes since the last election in 1999. The Conservative Party stayed in overall control of the council.

Background
Before the election the Conservatives had a majority on the council with 21 seats, compared to 9 for the Liberal Democrats, 6 for Labour and 3 independents.

Issues at the election included housing, with the Conservatives saying they would make more land available, council tax, where the Liberal Democrats attacked the Conservatives for a 19.9% increase, and waste collection, with Labour objecting to the end of large waste collection, which they said had led to fly tipping. The Liberal Democrats said they were targeting seats in the villages of Baslow and Taddington, while Labour said they were aiming for Darley Dale. However the Conservatives were guaranteed seats after the election, as 13 of their candidates faced no opposition, the highest number of any council in the country.

Election result
The Conservatives gained 3 seats to increase their majority on the council with 24 councillors, after gaining seats from independents in Bakewell ward. The Liberal Democrats remained on 9 seats, while Labour finished with 5 seats and 1 independent was elected. Turnout at the election varied between a high of 52% and a low of 24%, but was down on the 1999 election.

Ward results

By-elections between 2003 and 2007

All Saints Matlock
A by-election in All Saints Matlock was held on 27 November 2003 after the Liberal Democrat councillor Martin Burfoot was forced to resign after complaints of a conflict of interest due to his holding a position on the Peak District National Park Authority. His wife Sue Burfoot held the seat for the Liberal Democrats.

Litton and Longstone

Winster & South Darley

Lathkill & Bradford

References

2003
2003 English local elections
2000s in Derbyshire